The Department of International Relations and Cooperation (DIRCO) is the foreign ministry of the South African government. It is responsible for South Africa's relationships with foreign countries and international organizations, and runs South Africa's diplomatic missions. The department is headed by the Minister of International Relations and Cooperation, currently Naledi Pandor.

Formerly known as the Department of Foreign Affairs, it was renamed the Department of International Relations and Cooperation by President Jacob Zuma in May 2009. In the 2010 national budget, it received an appropriation of 4,824.4 million rand, and had 4,533 employees.

According to OECD estimates, 2019 official development assistance from South Africa decreased to US$106 million. In 2022, when Cuba asked for humanitarian medical and food aid, AfriForum managed to obtain an interdict against a pending R50 million payout by the department, labelling it "squandering of taxpayers' money". The chairperson of the Portfolio Committee on International Relations and Cooperation, Supra Mahumapelo, decried the ruling due to its believed impact on South Africa's solidarity work with countries like Cuba.

References

External links
 Official website

Foreign affairs
Foreign relations of South Africa
South Africa